110th Regiment or 110th Infantry Regiment may refer to:

 110th Mahratta Light Infantry, a unit of the British Indian Army
 110th Regiment of Foot (Queen's Royal Musqueteers), a unit of the British Army
 110th Regiment of Foot (1794), a unit of the British Army

 American Civil War regiments
 2nd Alabama Volunteer Infantry Regiment (African Descent) (110th U.S. Regiment Colored Troops), a unit of the Union (Northern) Army
 110th Ohio Infantry, a unit of the Union (Northern) Army

See also
 110th Division (disambiguation)
 110th Squadron (disambiguation)